On the morning of September 4, 2005, six days after Hurricane Katrina struck New Orleans, members of the New Orleans Police Department (NOPD), ostensibly responding to a call from an officer under fire, shot and killed two civilians at the Danziger Bridge: 17-year-old James Brissette and 40-year-old Ronald Madison. Four other civilians were wounded. All the victims were African-American. None were armed or had committed any crime. Madison, a mentally disabled man, was shot in the back. The shootings caused public anger and further eroded the trust New Orleans had in the federal response to Hurricane Katrina and the NOPD.

The NOPD attempted to cover-up the killings, falsely reporting that seven police officers responded to a police dispatch reporting an officer down, and that at least four suspects were firing weapons at the officers upon their arrival. Rev. Raymond Brown, the local head of the National Action Network, described the shootings as "...a racial tragedy."

On August 5, 2011, a federal jury in New Orleans convicted five NOPD officers of myriad charges related to the cover-up and deprivation of civil rights. An attorney for the Justice Department described the case as "the most significant police misconduct prosecution [in the U.S.] since the Rodney King beating case". However, the convictions were vacated on September 17, 2013 by U.S. District Judge Kurt Engelhardt due to prosecutorial misconduct, and a new trial was ordered. The Justice Department appealed the decision to vacate the convictions, but a federal appeals court agreed that a new trial was warranted. However, on April 20, 2016, the five former officers pleaded guilty to various charges related to the shooting, and in return received reduced sentences ranging from three to twelve years. Three of the officers are white and two are African-American.

Shooting on the bridge
On September 4, 2005, almost a week after Hurricane Katrina struck New Orleans, several New Orleans Police Department (NOPD) officers arrived at the Danziger Bridge. The officers involved included Sgt. Kenneth Bowen, Sgt. Robert Gisevius, Officer Anthony Villavaso, and Officer Robert Faulcon. The officers arrived in a Budget rental truck; none of them were in uniform; and they were armed with rifles including AK-47s, at least one of which was unauthorized, and an M4 carbine assault rifle. A witness, Kasimir Gaston, described the men as lining up "like at a firing range". The officers opened fire without warning on the Bartholomew family and friend, who had been walking to a grocery store and were then sheltering behind a concrete barrier.

As a result of this initial shooting, 17-year-old James Brissette — a family friend — was killed. Four other civilians were wounded. Susan Bartholomew's arm was partially shot off and later had to be amputated. Her husband, Leonard, was shot in the back, head and foot. The Bartholomews' teenage daughter Lesha was shot four times. Jose Holmes Jr., a friend of Brissette's, was shot in the abdomen, the hand and the jaw.

Two brothers who fled the scene, Ronald and Lance Madison, were pursued down the bridge by officers Gisevius and Faulcon in an unmarked state police vehicle. Faulcon fired his shotgun from the back of the car at Ronald, a developmentally disabled man who later died from his injuries. The autopsy found that Ronald Madison sustained seven gunshot wounds, five of them in his back. Bowen was later convicted of stomping Madison on the back before he died, though this conviction was overturned for lack of physical evidence. Lance Madison was then taken into custody and charged with eight counts of attempting to kill police officers. He was held in custody for three weeks before being released without indictment.

No weapons were recovered at the scene, and both police and civilian witnesses testified that the victims had been unarmed. Later investigation showed that some shots had been fired in the area by trapped residents attempting to attract the attention of rescuers.

Initial investigation and cover-up
The NOPD shooters stated that while approaching the Danziger Bridge, they had been fired on by civilians, and were forced to return fire. Homicide detective Arthur "Archie" Kaufman was made the lead investigator on the case. He was later found guilty of conspiring with the defendants to conceal evidence in order to make the shootings appear justified, including fabricating information for his official reports on the case. NOPD Lieutenant Michael Lohman also encouraged the officers to "provide false stories about what had precipitated the shooting" and plant a firearm near the scene.

Continued investigation
The officers involved in the shooting were taken into custody on January 2, 2007, and were indicted for murder and attempted murder. Gisevius, Bowen, and Villavaso were charged with the first-degree murder of Brissette. Faulcon was charged with the first-degree murder of Madison. Those officers, as well as NOPD officers Michael Hunter, Ignatius Hills and Robert Barrios, were indicted on charges of attempted murder relating to the other four victims. On August 13, 2008, the indictments were dismissed by District Judge Raymond Bigelow due to prosecutorial misconduct. Bigelow found that the prosecutors had wrongly instructed the grand jury, improperly used grand jury testimony against three of the defendants, and divulged grand jury testimony to a witness in the case.

Two weeks later, the FBI and the Civil Rights Division of the U.S. Department of Justice began investigating the case. U.S. Attorney Jim Letten of the Eastern District of Louisiana vowed his office would take "as much time and resources as necessary" to resolve the case.

In 2010, the investigation resulted in a series of guilty pleas from participants in the cover-up. On February 24, 2010, Lohman entered a plea of guilty to obstruction of justice in federal court. On March 11, Jeffrey Lehrmann, another former NOPD officer, pleaded guilty to misprision of a felony for failing to report the cover-up. On April 7, Michael Hunter, one of the seven officers originally charged with attempted murder in 2007, pleaded guilty to misprision of a felony and obstruction of justice. Hunter later became a key witness in the case against Bowen, Gisevius, Faulcon, and Villavaso.

On April 16, Barrios was charged with one count of conspiring to obstruct justice, becoming the fourth NOPD officer to be federally charged in the case. He promptly resigned from the force and cooperated with the investigation. A fifth man, Marion David Ryder, a civilian who witnessed the incident and falsely represented himself as an armed law enforcement officer, was also charged in the case. He was accused of lying to the FBI about the event when he claimed that one of the victims had a weapon. Ryder also faced a firearm charge since he was a convicted felon. On April 28, Barrios and Ryder both pleaded guilty. On May 21, Hills was charged by a bill of information with one count of conspiring to obstruct justice and one count of misprision of a felony, becoming the fifth NOPD officer to be federally charged. He had resigned from the force the previous day. A former police officer stated at Hills' trial that he had used a racial slur in later describing how he tried to "pop a round off" at 14-year-old Leonard Bartholomew. Hill and Bartholomew are both African-American.

On July 13, 2010, a federal grand jury indicted Bowen, Gisevius, Faulcon, and Villavaso in connection with the shooting and subsequent cover-up. Additionally, Kaufman and Gerard Dugue, the original investigators in the case, were charged with falsifying reports and false prosecution in the conspiracy to cover up the shooting. While the federal government lacked jurisdiction to file murder charges in the case, they were able to file charges under federal civil rights statutes intended to enforce Section 1 of the Fourteenth Amendment. Under Title 18 U.S.C. Section 242, "Deprivation of Rights Under Color of Law", anyone who acts, under color of law, to unlawfully deprive a citizen of their right to life, may be sentenced to death.

Sentencing
On September 22, 2010, Lehrmann was sentenced to three years in prison. In 2011, prosecutors asked a judge to reduce his sentence due to his cooperation, but the request was rejected on the grounds that he had already been sufficiently rewarded for his cooperation. Lehrmann was released from prison on April 22, 2014.

On December 1, 2010, Hunter was sentenced to 8 years in prison and three years of supervised release. He was also fined $2500.

On September 24, 2011, Ryder was sentenced to 8 months in prison, followed by 8 months of home detention. He was released from prison on June 1, 2012.

On October 5, 2011, Hills was sentenced to 6.5 years in prison.

On November 2, 2011, Lohman was sentenced to 4 years in prison and three years of supervised release. Prosecutors asked for a two-year sentence due to his cooperation, but the request was rejected. He was also fined $2500, and ordered to perform 300 hours of community service and meet with NOPD recruit classes to warn other officer who could be tempted to break the law. Lohman was released from prison on June 26, 2015.

On December 1, 2011, Barrios was sentenced to 5 years in prison. He was released from prison on May 17, 2016.

Guilty verdicts were handed down for Bowen, Gisevius, Faulcon, Villavaso and Kaufman on August 5, 2011. On April 4, 2012, District Judge Kurt D. Engelhardt sentenced Faulcon to 65 years' imprisonment, Bowen and Gisevius to 40 years, Villavaso to 38 years, and Kaufman to six years. Engelhardt was critical of how the prosecution had been pursued, stating that he was "astonished and deeply troubled" by the number of plea bargains offered to other participants who served as witnesses. Federal prosecutors responded that the plea bargains had been necessary for a difficult case that had been "cold" when they assumed responsibility.

Although federal prosecutors recommended sentence reductions for both Hunter and Hills due to their cooperation, their requests were rejected. In both cases, the presiding judge pointed out that the two were already receiving a great deal of leniency, as both had maliciously fired shots and missed. In Hills's case, the judge also said that he and Villavaso had essentially committed the same crime, but only Villavaso was facing decades in prison. Hunter was released from prison on September 17, 2018, and Hills was released from prison on July 11, 2017.

Gerard Dugue, who is alleged to have conspired in the cover-up with Kaufman, had his original hearing ruled a mistrial in January 2012. His retrial was postponed to allow for appellate court petitions from both the prosecution and defense, and was set for March 11, 2013, then delayed and set for May 13. It was later delayed indefinitely.

Retrial ordered
On May 18, 2012, a month after they were convicted, the five officers appealed their convictions, arguing that federal prosecutors had engaged in a public relations campaign against their clients by anonymously posting comments on NOLA.com, the website of New Orleans newspaper The Times-Picayune. Principally, the defendants cited comments made by Sal Perricone, the former top trial attorney for the Eastern District (though Perricone was not involved in the prosecution of the Danziger Bridge case). Perricone's activities had been exposed in March 2012 in an unrelated case, and he had resigned soon afterward.

On September 17, 2013, following a year-long probe into the defendants' claims, Judge Engelhardt vacated the convictions of Bowen, Faulcon, Gisevius, Villavaso and Kaufman, and ordered a new trial. In his decision, Engelhardt cited what he called "highly unusual, extensive and truly bizarre actions" by prosecutors; specifically, leaks to certain media outlets and comments that were posted by members of the U.S. Attorney's Office in online forums. The probe revealed that Perricone had made numerous posts attacking the NOPD as early as 2008, and had also made posts urging witnesses to join Lohman in pleading guilty. It also revealed that Perricone and Justice Department official Karla Dobinski had made posts regarding trial testimony while the trial was underway. Dobinski was the head of a Justice Department "taint team" that was to help ensure testimony Bowen gave to the state grand jury wasn't used improperly. The Justice Department appealed Engelhardt's decision to the United States Court of Appeals for the Fifth Circuit, however, a panel of judges upheld the ruling in a 2-1 decision.

While awaiting his retrial, Kaufman successfully sought release on bond since he did not fire a gun in the shootings.

Guilty pleas

On April 20, 2016, five former officers pleaded guilty to charges of deprivation of rights under color of law, obstruction of justice, and conspiracy to obstruct justice. In return, they were sentenced to significantly reduced sentences of three to twelve years in prison, with credit for time served. Gisevius' attorney, Eric Hessler, later said a number of potential witnesses in the planned retrial were too afraid to testify. In addition to the online commenting scandal, several witnesses had been threatened by prosecutors and investigators. According to Hessler, this left no option but to accept a plea bargain. Those who pleaded guilty included the four former officers who took part in the shootings and the former officer who covered up the incident after it happened.

On November 4, 2016, Dugue pleaded guilty in federal court to "a misdemeanor charge of accessory after the fact to deprivation of rights under the color of law". He was sentenced to one year of probation, making him the only NOPD officer who pleaded guilty in the case, but was not sent to prison. Dugue's sentencing marked the end of the criminal cases against the police officers involved in the shootings and cover-up.

Civil lawsuits and settlement
Four civil lawsuits involving eight plaintiffs and seventeen defendants had been filed in federal court, but were on hold until the criminal cases were resolved. Defendants in the civil lawsuits included the City of New Orleans, the NOPD, a former police chief and assistant chief, and Mayor Ray Nagin. The four lawsuits were consolidated before U.S. District Judge Jane Triche Milazzo.

On December 19, 2016, New Orleans Mayor Mitch Landrieu announced a settlement agreement between the city and the families of the Danziger Bridge shootings, plus two other cases involving "lethal confrontations between officers and civilians in the aftermath of Hurricane Katrina. The settlement includes payments for the families of victims killed or injured in the shooting of unarmed civilians on the Danziger Bridge; for the beating death of Raymond Robair, 48, who was killed before the storm; and for the fatal shooting of Henry Glover, who was killed by a police officer standing guard outside an Algiers shopping center."

As part of his news conference announcing the settlement, Mayor Landrieu also issued a verbal apology to the families of all of the victims, which is considered rare for any city leader to do in cases of proven police brutality. The settlement was also revealed to have totaled $13.3 million.

Timeline of events

See also
Crime in Louisiana
Death of Henry Glover
Effects of Hurricane Katrina in New Orleans
List of killings by law enforcement officers in the United States

References

Further reading

External links
 Grand Jury Indictment at the Times Picayune 
 NPR.org story about guilty pleas

2005 in Louisiana
Deaths by firearm in Louisiana
Police brutality in the United States
+Danziger
Crimes in New Orleans
2005 murders in the United States
Mass shootings in Louisiana
Attacks in the United States in 2005
21st century in New Orleans
+Danziger